Mohamed Ezat (born 29 July 1978) is an Egyptian chess player.

Career

Ezat has represented Egypt at multiple Chess Olympiads, including 2006, 2008 and 2010,

He qualified for the Chess World Cup 2009, where he was defeated by Teimour Radjabov the first round.

References

External links
 
Mohamed Ezat chess-games at 365Chess.com

1978 births
Living people
Egyptian chess players
Chess Olympiad competitors